Atapalluni (Aymara itapallu, atapallu nettle, -ni a suffix to indicate ownership, "the one with the nettle (or nettles)", also spelled Atapallune) is a mountain in the Andes of southern Peru, about  high. It is situated in the Puno Region, El Collao Province, Santa Rosa District, and in the Chucuito Province, Pisacoma District.

References

Mountains of Puno Region
Mountains of Peru